Evan O. Jones (March 24, 1830 – April 28, 1915) was a member of the Wisconsin State Assembly and the Wisconsin State Senate.

Biography
Jones was born in Denbighshire, Wales. In January 1857, he married Mary Ann Roberts. They had three children.  Evan O. Jones was the brother of architect David R. Jones.

Career
Jones was a member of the Assembly from 1866 to 1867 and of the Senate from 1873 to 1874. Additionally, he was Chairman of Supervisors, Clerk and President of Cambria, Wisconsin and a justice of the peace. He was a Republican.

He died in his home in Cambria after a lengthy illness.

References

People from Denbighshire
Welsh emigrants to the United States
People from Cambria, Wisconsin
Republican Party Wisconsin state senators
Republican Party members of the Wisconsin State Assembly
Mayors of places in Wisconsin
American justices of the peace
1830 births
Year of death missing